Enning is an unincorporated community in Meade County, South Dakota, United States. Although not tracked by the Census Bureau, Enning has been assigned the ZIP code of 57737.

The first settlement at Enning was made in 1910.

References

Unincorporated communities in Meade County, South Dakota
Rapid City, South Dakota metropolitan area
Unincorporated communities in South Dakota